George I was King of the Abkhazian from circa 864 to 871. He was the third son of Leon II of the Anchabadze dynasty. He succeeded his brother Demetrius II. His nickname "Aghts’epeli" is linked to his former domain of Aghtseph.

Life 
The Divan of the Abkhazian Kings designates him as the brother of his predecessor but does not indicate the duration of his reign. According to the Georgian Chronicles he is indeed the brother of Theodosius and Demetrius, and son of Leon. George I took control of Kartli and granted it to Tinen, a son of his brother Demetrius II, whose second son Bagrat was reportedly exiled to Byzantine Empire for an unknown reason. On the death of Georges I, his wife, whose name is not specified, seduced by a nobleman, the John Shavliani, put on death Tinen and attempted to kill Bagrat to give the throne of Abkhazia to her lover.

Genealogy

Bibliography 
 Marie-Félicité Brosset, Histoire de la Géorgie.

George 01